Joni Lius (born March 4, 1971) is a Finnish former professional ice hockey player.

Lius began his career with JYP and stayed with the team for seven seasons.  He played for Frölunda HC in the Elitserien for two seasons and the Vienna Capitals in the Austrian Ice Hockey Association for one year. However, Lius played the majority of his career with TPS Turku in the SM-liiga.

Career statistics

References

External links

1971 births
Living people
Finnish expatriate ice hockey players in Austria
Finnish expatriate ice hockey players in Sweden
Finnish ice hockey centres
Frölunda HC players
JYP Jyväskylä players
HC TPS players
Vienna Capitals players
People from Keuruu
Sportspeople from Central Finland